Familok is a type of house for many families, designed for workers of the heavy industry, mainly coal miners, built at the end of the 19th century and beginning of the 20th century in the cities and towns of Silesia.

"Familok" is a Silesian way of pronouncing the original German name, Familien-Block (lit. family apartment house).

In several towns they are protected by conservationists and renovated due to the historical significance. The protected familoks include the ones in Nikiszowiec of Katowice, Kolonia Zgorzelec in Bytom, Kolonia Emma in Radlin, Ruda Śląska, cities situated in Silesia, and Bohumín situated in Karviná District, Moravian-Silesian Region, Czech Republic, on the border with Silesia.

External links 
 Old familoks in Katowice-Nikiszowiec in black and white

House types
History of Silesia
Architecture in Poland
Architecture in Germany
House styles
Upper Silesia